The Euro Hockey Challenge is a competition consisting of the 12 best European ice hockey teams. It has been held annually in April since 2011, preceding the World Ice Hockey Championships.

Setup
Each team plays six games during the tournament. Teams play each other twice in back-to-back games over the course of one to two days. All games played count toward the final table.

The teams are divided into three pools based on their placing in the IIHF World Ranking. The top four teams make up Pool A, the next six are part of Pool B, and the final two are placed in Pool C. Teams are awarded three points for a victory in regulation, two points for an overtime victory, and one point for an overtime loss.

Participating nations
The top 12 European nations in the IIHF World Ranking are eligible to participate.

The following nations participated in the 2013 tournament:

Results

References

Ice hockey tournaments in Europe